The  is one of the largest and most famous festivals in Japan, taking place annually during the month of July in Kyoto. Many events take place in central Kyoto and at the Yasaka Shrine, the festival's patron shrine, located in Kyoto's famous Gion district, which gives the festival its name. It is formally a Shinto festival, and its original purposes were purification and pacification of disease-causing entities. There are many ceremonies held during the festival, but it is best known for its two  processions of floats, which take place on July 17 and 24.

History

Ancient years

The Gion Festival originated during an epidemic as part of a purification ritual to appease the gods thought to cause fire, floods, and earthquakes. In 869, when people were suffering from a plague attributed to vengeful spirits, Emperor Seiwa ordered prayers to Susanoo-no-Mikoto, the god of the Yasaka Shrine. This practice was repeated wherever an outbreak of plague occurred. By the year 1000, the festival became an annual event and it has since seldom failed to take place. During the civil Onin War (under the Ashikaga shogunate), central Kyoto was devastated, and the festival was halted for three decades in the late 15th and early 16th centuries. Later in the 16th century, it was revived by the shogun Oda Nobunaga.

Over the centuries, some floats have been destroyed or otherwise lost, and in recent years several have been restored. Float neighborhood associations sometimes purchase antique tapestries to replace worn or destroyed ones, or commission replicas from industrial weavers in Kyoto, or design and commission new ones from the weavers of Kyoto's famous traditional Nishijin weaving district. When they are not in use, the floats and regalia are kept in special storehouses throughout the central district of Kyoto, or at Yasaka Shrine.

The festival serves as an important setting in Yasunari Kawabata's novel, The Old Capital, in which he describes the Gion Festival as one of "the 'three great festivals' of the old capital", along with the Festival of Ages and the Aoi Festival.

Gallery

Schedule of events

Following is a list of selected annual events in the Gion Festival.
 July 1–5: , opening ceremony of festival in each participating neighborhood
 July 2: , a lottery to determine the order of floats in the parade, conducted at the municipal assembly hall
 July 7: Shrine visit by  children of 
 July 10: Lantern parade to welcome 
 July 10–13: Building of floats
 July 13 (a.m.): Shrine visit by  children of 
 July 13 (p.m.): Shrine visit by  children of Kuse Shrine
 July 14: 
 July 15: 
 July 16: 
 July 16: , art performances
 July 17: Parade of  floats
 July 18–20: Building of floats
 July 21: 
 July 22: 
 July 23: 
 July 24: Parade of  float
 July 24: Parade of 
 July 31: Closing service at Eki Shrine

Yamaboko floats

The floats in the  parade are divided into two groups, the larger  ("halberd") and the smaller  ("mountain"), and are collectively called . The ten  recall the 66 halberds or spears used in the original purification ritual, and the 24  carry life-sized figures of Shinto deities, Buddhist bodhisattvas, and other historic and cultural figures. All the floats are decorated with diverse tapestries, some made in Nishijin, Kyoto's traditional textile-weaving district, while others have been imported from all over the world. In fact, thanks to a 1993 survey of the Gion Festival's imported textiles by a team of international textile conservationists and collectors, its unique textile collection is renowned amongst textile professionals worldwide. Musicians sit in the floats playing drums and flutes. The floats are pulled with ropes down the street and good luck favors are thrown from the floats to the crowd.  were listed on the Important Intangible Folk Cultural Properties in 1979, and on the Representative List of the Intangible Cultural Heritage of Humanity in 2009.

It's believed the deities purify all the neighborhoods along the way. They reside at the otabisho for a week, between the two floats' processions. On the 24th they are taken back to the Yasaka Shrine to their permanent dwelling. On the way back to the shrine, the procession stops at Shinsen-en, the original site of the first rituals in the year 869, the former Imperial garden.

Each year, the neighborhood associations which maintain the floats draw lots in early July. This lottery determines the order in which the floats will appear in the July 17 and 24 processions. These lots are presented in a special ceremony at the commence of the processions, during which the Mayor of Kyoto dons the robes of a magistrate.

The Naginata Hoko depicts a  wearing a ceremonial robe and wearing a golden phoenix, chosen as the sacred page of a deity from among merchant houses in Kyoto. After several weeks of special ablution ceremonies, he lives in isolation from the effects of contamination (such as inappropriate food and the presence of women) and is not allowed to touch the ground, so he is placed in a wagon.

Hoko floats
Weight: about 12 tons
Height: about 27 meters
Wheel diameter: about 1.9 m
Attendants: about 30–40 pulling during procession, usually two men piloting with wedges

Yama floats
Weight: 1,200–1,600 kg
Height: about 6 m
Attendants: 14–24 people to pull, push or carry

See also
Gion cult

Notes

External links 

 Gion Matsuri Procession Route 2014 

 https://gionfestival.org

Religious festivals in Japan
Festivals in Kyoto
Shinto festivals
Shinto in Kyoto
Tourist attractions in Kyoto
Cultural festivals in Japan
869 establishments
970 establishments
1530s in Japan
Summer events in Japan
9th-century establishments in Japan
Gion faith
Goryō faith